The "flag ticket" franc was a currency issued by the United States for use in Allied-occupied France in the wake of the Battle of Normandy. With the swift take-over of sovereignty by General Charles de Gaulle, who considered the US occupation franc as “counterfeit money”, the currency rapidly faded out of use in favour of the pre-war French franc.

Gallery

External links 

 Dubious Liberators: Allied Plans to Occupy France, 1942-1944, by Ted Rall (archived from the original).

Currencies of France
Currency symbols
Modern obsolete currencies